In mathematics, pointwise convergence is one of various senses in which a sequence of functions can converge to a particular function. It is weaker than uniform convergence, to which it is often compared.

Definition

A net or sequence of functions  all having the same domain  and codomain  is said to converge pointwise to a given function  often written as

if (and only if)

The function  is said to be the pointwise limit function of the 

Sometimes, authors use the term bounded pointwise convergence when there is a constant   such that    .

Properties

This concept is often contrasted with uniform convergence.  To say that

means that

That is a stronger statement than the assertion of pointwise convergence: every uniformly convergent sequence is pointwise convergent, to the same limiting function, but some pointwise convergent sequences are not uniformly convergent. For example, if  is a sequence of functions defined by  then  pointwise on the interval  but not uniformly.

The pointwise limit of a sequence of continuous functions may be a discontinuous function, but only if the convergence is not uniform. For example,

takes the value  when  is an integer and  when  is not an integer, and so is discontinuous at every integer.

The values of the functions  need not be real numbers, but may be in any topological space, in order that the concept of pointwise convergence make sense.  Uniform convergence, on the other hand, does not make sense for functions taking values in topological spaces generally, but makes sense for functions taking values in metric spaces, and, more generally, in uniform spaces.

Topology

Let  denote the set of all functions from some given set  into some topological space 
As described in the article on characterizations of the category of topological spaces, if certain conditions are met then it is possible to define a unique topology on a set in terms of what nets do and do not converge. 
A net in  converges in this topology if and only if it converges pointwise. 

If the codomain  is compact, then by Tychonoff's theorem, the space  is also compact.

Almost everywhere convergence

In measure theory, one talks about almost everywhere convergence  of a sequence of measurable functions defined on a measurable space. That means pointwise convergence almost everywhere, that is, on a subset of the domain whose complement has measure zero. Egorov's theorem states that pointwise convergence almost everywhere on a set of finite measure implies uniform convergence on a slightly smaller set.

Almost everywhere pointwise convergence on the space of functions on a measure space does not define the structure of a topology on the space of measurable functions on a measure space (although it is a convergence structure). For in a topological space, when every subsequence of a sequence has itself a subsequence with the same subsequential limit, the sequence itself must converge to that limit. 

But consider the sequence of so-called "galloping rectangles" functions, which are defined using the floor function: let  and  mod  and let

Then any subsequence of the sequence  has a sub-subsequence which itself converges almost everywhere to zero, for example, the subsequence of functions which do not vanish at  But at no point does the original sequence converge pointwise to zero. Hence, unlike convergence in measure and  convergence, pointwise convergence almost everywhere is not the convergence of any topology on the space of functions.

See also

References

Convergence (mathematics)
Measure theory
Topological spaces
Topology of function spaces
hu:Függvénysorozatok konvergenciája#Pontonkénti konvergencia